Beanie Babies 2.0 were a brand of stuffed toys, a spin-off of the popular Beanie Babies line, announced by Ty Inc. on January 2, 2008. The group was introduced following the retirement of all retail Beanie Babies (barring exclusive international and store-specific styles, as well as licensed characters) that had been produced prior to 2004.

Each toy came with a special code. Once the buyer entered the code on Ty's website, the buyer was granted access to an online environment, in which the user could gather points and communicate with other users through chat services. The chat is similar to child-friendly games such as Club Penguin, which allow pre-selected prompts to be used if the user has not been given permission (presumably from their parents) to access the full chat, where anything can be typed. The prompts could also be used in addition to full chat. The website offered various activities, including opportunities to make friends. Buyers with a Ty Girlz account and a Beanie Baby 2.0 also had access to the Beanie Babies 2.0 site.

With Bo the Portuguese Water Dog being the last official Beanie Baby 2.0 (announced in April 2009) and the introduction of a new offshoot line of Beanie Babies called Beanie Boos, it was unclear as to whether the company had discontinued production of Beanie Babies 2.0 or whether future releases would be announced. In January 2010, in the new Ty spring catalog, the Beanie Babies 2.0 styles were shown merged with regular Beanie Babies, thus confirming that the line had been discontinued. For some time, the online site still maintained its functionality, and many Beanie Baby 2.0 styles still remain current. However, many styles, such as Ming the panda bear and Topper the giraffe, now sport original Beanie Baby hang tags without codes.

On June 7, 2013, the Beanie Babies 2.0 virtual world was officially closed, along with the Ty Girlz virtual world.

List of Beanie Babies 2.0
The following is a complete listing of all Beanie Babies 2.0. The line has been discontinued , but some new ones were released in July 2009 as Teenie Beanies, along with some originals.
Aussie the koala
Baabet the lamb - retired November 2008
Bo the Portuguese Water Dog
Bubble Gum the zebra (a winning design of the Make My Beanie Contest) - retired March 2009
Cargo the Bulldog - retired via Ty retailer site November 2010
Charlie the cow [a winning design of the Make My Beanie Contest] - retired March 2009
Cleo the monkey
Chill the penguin
Chompy the alligator
Clipper the dolphinCricket the cat - retired November 2010Duchess the poodle - retired October 2008Eggs 2008 the bear - reissued April 2010 as part of the original Beanie Babies lineFable the unicorn - retired April 2010Fletch the Golden Retriever - retired October 2010Fluffball the guinea pig - retired April 2008Frank the Dachshund - reissued April 2010 as part of the original Beanie Babies lineFrolics the Cocker SpanielHeartland the bearHenley the henHopsy the bunny - Retired December 2010Hutches the bunny - Ty Store exclusive; retired May 2011Hydrant the Dalmatian - retired April 2010Jumps the frog - retired April 2008Jungle the langur monkeyLefty the donkeyLove to Mom the bearLuckier the bearMaiden the ladybug - retired April 2010McLucky the bear - Ty Store exclusive; retired March 2009Midas the lionMing  the panda bear - reissued April 2010 as part of the original Beanie Babies line; retired March 2011Motherly the bear - Hallmark exclusive; retired January 2009Oasis the tigerPico the Chihuahua - retired April 2008Pops the gorillaPurry the cat - retired May 2008Princess the poodleQuackly the duck - retired March 2009Rascal the labradoodle - retired April 2008Ricky the raccoonRighty the elephantSaddle the horseScaredy the catScholars the bear (2008 release with the mortarboard) - retired April 2010Scholars the bear (2009 release without the mortarboard)Shearsly the lamb - Retired November 2008Skunkers the skunk - retired via Ty retailer site March 2011Sledder the husky - reissued April 2010 as part of the original Beanie Babies lineSlithery the snakeSniffs the pigSplits the flamingoTopper the giraffe - reissued April 2010 as part of the original Beanie Babies lineTrooper  the DobermanVines the monkey - born on May 3, 2010Woolsy the lamb - retired November 2008Yule''' the beaver

References

External links
The Official Ty website

Beanie Babies